Scafell Pike is the highest and the most prominent mountain in England, at an elevation of  above sea level. It is located in the Lake District National Park, in Cumbria, and is part of the Southern Fells and the Scafell massif.

Scafell Pike forms part of the inactive Scafells volcano.

Etymology and name history
The name Scafell is believed by some to derive from the Old Norse skalli fjall, meaning either the fell with the shieling or the fell with the bald summit, and is first recorded in 1578 in the corrupted form Skallfield. An alternative derivation is from the Old Norse "skagi", meaning a cape, headland, promontory or peninsula – so giving an etymology that aligns with Skaw in Shetland. It originally referred to Scafell, which neighbours Scafell Pike. What are now known as Scafell Pike, Ill Crag, and Broad Crag were collectively called either the Pikes (peaks) or the Pikes of Scawfell (see below regarding spelling); from many angles Scafell seems to be the highest peak, and the others were thus considered subsidiary to it. The name Scawfell Pikes was adopted "by common consent" according to Jonathan Otley, shortly before the publication of the 4th edition of his guidebook in 1830. Up to this point, England's highest mountain (its status as such was not known until the early 1800s) did not have a name of its own; it was labelled Sca-Fell Higher Top by the Ordnance Survey in their initial work in Cumbria in the first decade of the 19th century. The newly developed name reported by Otley first appeared on a published Ordnance Survey map in 1865.

Formerly the name was spelled Scawfell, which better reflects local pronunciation. This spelling has declined due to the Ordnance Survey's use of Scafell on their 1865 map and thereafter.

Topography
Scafell Pike is one of a horseshoe of high fells, open to the south, surrounding the head of Eskdale, Cumbria. It stands on the western side of the cirque, with Scafell to the south and Great End to the north. This ridge forms the watershed between Eskdale and Wasdale, which lies to the west.

The narrowest definition of Scafell Pike begins at the col of Mickledore  in the south, takes in the wide, stony summit area and ends at the next depression, Broad Crag  Col, c. . A more inclusive view takes in two further tops: Broad Crag,  and Ill Crag, the two being separated by Ill Crag Col, . This is the position taken by most guidebooks.

Scafell Pike also has outliers on either side of the ridge. Lingmell , to the north west, is invariably regarded as a separate fell, while Pen, a shapely summit above the Esk, is normally taken as a satellite of the Pike. Middleboot Knotts is a further top lying on the Wasdale slopes of Broad Crag, which is listed as a Nuttall.

The rough summit plateau is fringed by crags on all sides with Pikes Crag and Dropping Crag above Wasdale and Rough Crag to the east. Below Rough Crag and Pen is a further tier, named Dow Crag and Central Pillar on Ordnance Survey maps, although known as Esk Buttress among climbers.

Broad Crag Col is the source of Little Narrowcove Beck in the east and of Piers Gill in the west. The latter works its way around Lingmell to Wast Water through a spectacular ravine, one of the most impressive in the Lake District. It is treacherous in winter, as when it freezes over it creates an icy patch, with lethal exposure should you slip. Broad Crag is a small top with its principal face on the west and the smaller Green Crag looking down on Little Narrowcove. From Broad Crag, the ridge turns briefly east across Ill Crag Col and onto the shapely pyramidal summit of Ill Crag. Ill Crag and its associated crags overlook Eskdale.

Scafell Pike has a claim to the highest standing water body in England in Broad Crag Tarn, which (confusingly) is on Scafell Pike proper, rather than on Broad Crag. Foxes Tarn on Scafell is of comparable height.

Mountain classification
Scafell Pike is a Marilyn summit which automatically makes it a HuMP and a TuMP. Scafell Pike is topologically unusual because the Marilyn qualification contour line (150 metres below the summit) passes around Scafell which is itself a HuMP.

Scafell Pike's Maquaco Line also encloses three other TuMP summits, Broad Crag, Ill Crag and Great End.

Summit

The summit was donated to the National Trust in 1919 by Lord Leconfield "in perpetual memory of the men of the Lake District who fell for God and King, for freedom peace and right in the Great War 1914–1918 ...". There is a better-known war memorial on Great Gable, commemorating the members of the Fell & Rock Climbing Club.

The actual height of Scafell Pike is a matter of definition or guesswork. The highest point is buried beneath a massive summit cairn over 3 metres high and it is not known how high the fabric of the mountain rises under the cairn. Traditionally the height was given as a very memorable . The rounded metric height of 978 metres converts to 3209 feet.

Geology

Ordovician and volcanic activity 
Scafell Pike consists of igneous rock, including breccia, andesite and rhyolite, as well as geothermal tufa, dating from the Ordovician; it is geologically part of the Borrowdale Volcanics and along with the other peaks of the Scafells, forms part of an extinct volcano which was active around 400-450 million years ago.

Pleistocene glacial activity 
The rugged summit of Scafell Pike was shaped by glacial erosion of the Last Glacial Maximum (~20,000 YA), during which the Lake District was overlain by ice sheets with thicknesses of several kilometers.

Contemporary weathering 
The summit plateau of Scafell Pike, and that of other neighbouring peaks, is covered with shattered rock debris which provides the highest-altitude example of a summit boulder field in England. The boulder field is thought to have been caused in part by weathering, such as frost action. Additional factors are also considered to be important; however, opinion varies as to what these may be. James Clifton Ward suggested that weathering with earthquakes as a secondary agent could be responsible, while John Edward Marr and Reginald Aldworth Daly believed that earthquakes were unnecessary and suggested that frost action with other unspecified agents was more likely. To the north of the summit are a number of high altitude gills which flow into Lingmell Beck. These are good examples in Cumbria for this type of gill and are also biologically important due to their species richness.

Tourism 

Scafell Pike is a popular destination for walkers. There is open access to Scafell and the surrounding fells, with many walking and rock climbing routes. Paths connect the summit with Lingmell Col to the northwest, Mickledore to the southwest, and Esk Hause to the northeast, and these in turn connect with numerous other paths, giving access to walkers from many directions including Wasdale Head to the west, Seathwaite to the north, Langdale to the east, and Eskdale to the southwest. The shortest route is from Wasdale Head, about 80 metres above sea level, where there is a climbers' hotel, the Wasdale Head Inn, made popular in the Victorian period by Owen Glynne Jones and others. According to the National Trust, as of 2014 there were over 100,000 people per year climbing Scafell Pike from Wasdale Head, many as part of the National Three Peaks Challenge.

Survey point
Scafell Pike was used in 1826 as a station in the Principal Triangulation of Britain by the Ordnance Survey when they fixed the relative positions of Britain and Ireland. Angles between Slieve Donard in Northern Ireland and Scafell Pike were taken from Snowdon in Wales as were angles between Snowdon and Scafell Pike from Slieve Donard. Given the need for clear weather to achieve these very long-range observations ( to Slieve Donard), the Ordnance surveyors spent much of the summer camped on the respective mountain tops. Scafell Pike was not used as a station in the earlier part of the Principal Triangulation of Britain, even though Sca-Fell formed one corner of a Principal Triangle. The Ordnance Survey's high precision theodolite was not taken to the summit until 1841.

Views from the summit

Summer
 (Scroll left or right)

Winter

List of summits visible
As the highest ground in England, Scafell Pike has a very extensive view, ranging from the Mourne Mountains in Northern Ireland to Snowdonia in Wales. On a clear day, the following prominent mountain tops (Marilyns) can be seen the summit.

 Dun Rig, 2 degrees
 Binsey, 2 degrees
 Turner Cleuch Law, 4 degrees
 Dale Head, 5 degrees
 Wisp Hill, 11 degrees
 Skiddaw, 12 degrees
 Roan Fell, 15 degrees
 Knott, 17 degrees
 Peel Fell, 24 degrees
 Blencathra, 28 degrees
 The Cheviot, 31 degrees
 Cold Fell, 39 degrees
 Howgill Fells, 103 degrees
 Bow Fell, 105 degrees
 Boulsworth Hill, 135 degrees
 Pendle Hill, 138 degrees
 Ward's Stone, 142 degrees
 The Old Man of Coniston, 149 degrees
 Winter Hill, 154 degrees
 Snaefell, 257 degrees
 Slieve Donard, 262 degrees
 Slieve Croob, 268 degrees
 Beneraird, 303 degrees
 Merrick, 315 degrees
 Pillar, 318 degrees
 Cairnsmore of Carsphairn, 326 degrees
 High Stile, 328 degrees
 Criffel, 334 degrees
 Grasmoor, 342 degrees
 Great Gable, 351 degrees

See also

 Ben Nevis
 Geology of the United Kingdom
 Langdale axe industry
 List of mountains and hills of the United Kingdom
 List of fells in the Lake District
 Snowdon

Notes

References

External links
 Computer generated virtual panoramas North South Index
 Scafell Pike is at coordinates 
 Scafell Pike Sunny Photos from the West at Wasdale Head and North from Borrowdale by Keswick 
Descriptions of the Walking Routes up Scafell Pike

Marilyns of England
Hewitts of England
Fells of the Lake District
Nuttalls
Climbing areas of England
Highest points of English counties
Mountains under 1000 metres
Furths
Borough of Copeland